André Paris (6 August 1925 – 27 March 2016) was a French long-distance runner. He competed in the men's 10,000 metres at the 1948 Summer Olympics.

References

External links
 

1925 births
2016 deaths
Athletes (track and field) at the 1948 Summer Olympics
Athletes (track and field) at the 1952 Summer Olympics
French male long-distance runners
French male steeplechase runners
Olympic athletes of France
Place of birth missing